Created by the Assembly of European Regions (AER), the Youth Regional Network (YRN) is a platform of regional-level youth organisations, councils and parliaments from across wider Europe. The platform works as a forum where young people can influence regional and European policy while exchanging experiences and good practice.  
At the general Assembly in Vojvodina on 7 May 2017, YRN members elected their presidium, which is composed as follow:

 YRN President, Gloria VITALY, Oppland (NO) 
 Vice-President, Grete KESKULA, Saaremaa (EE) 
 Vice-President, Katalin ARANY, Csongrad (HU)
 Vice-President, Sander Delp HORN, Nordland (NO)
 President of the Committee for Economy and Regional development Vahram VARDANYAN, Yerevan (AM)
 President of the Social and Health Committee Paula HOLST, Varmland (SE)
 President of the Cultural and Education Committee Giovanni BRIGANTI, Wallonia (BE)

Background

AER's Youth Regional Network was established on 25 November 2008 in Wiesbaden (Hessen region, Germany), where a founding meeting of ninety young people representing 55 European regions launched Europe's first platform of regional youth councils, parliaments and organisations. They adopted the Wiesbaden Resolution, in order to define their main priorities and goals.

The YRN was founded on the idea that decision-making should be based upon the principle of subsidiarity. This means that, on the one hand, youth policy at European level should reflect the diversity of the regions and of the young people that live in those regions. On the other hand, youth policy within the regions should maintain a European dimension so that the common challenges faced by all young people can be tackled in co-operation with the sharing of ideas, knowledge and experiences.

2010 In order to ensure that YRN  functions as a genuine platform linking regional youth Councils/parliaments/NGOs with AER and its activities, the AER General Assembly agrees to adopt the Declaration on Enhanced Cooperation with YRN, which marks the recognition of its role and commitment within AER, among AER member regions & at the European level.

2013 YRN adopted its statutes, rule of procedures and strategic priorities. From May 2013, YRN got a seat in the AER Executive Board.

Mission

The mission of the YRN is to provide young people the opportunity to exchange views with other young people in order to get them more involved at the European and regional democratic processes.

Objectives

There YRN has four main objectives: networking, influencing policy, exchanging best practice and experience and promoting sustainable governance.

See also

Youth Participation

Youth Summer Academy: Held annually over a five-day period, each summer academy focuses upon a specific theme and is hosted by an AER member region. The concept of the AER Summer Academy evolved in 1996 as a response to the increase in AER member regions coming from the countries of Central and Eastern Europe. The Summer Academy was therefore designed as a tool to facilitate the exchange of experience and information. The Summer Academy has since evolved into an annual forum for exchange of experience in the area of regional development in Europe.

AER Youth Participation Report: The AER Youth Participation Report aims at promoting the involvement of young people in regional and national political processes and public life, by promoting the work done by regional and national youth councils, parliaments and organization across wider Europe and identifying good practices in this field.

Awards

"Do you speak European?" competition: this annual public speaking and personal expression contest gives teams of young people aged between 14 and 18 the opportunity to answer the question "What does Europe mean to you?". The competition's European-level final is preceded by regional and national heats that take place across the whole of Europe.

The Most Youth-Friendly European Region (MYFER) Award: in 2001, AER launched an award for the Most Youth-Friendly European Region. The award is presented every two years to the region that submits the most outstanding project or other initiative promoting youth issues. The 2014 edition of the Most Youth Friendly Region award (MYFER) will seek to underpin the topic of youth participation in democratic life with examples of best practice from the European regions.

Other

AER European Citizens Forums: The forums aim to engage young citizens and regional politicians in a debate with representatives of the European Union on the future of Europe.

Eurodyssey: Eurodyssey is an interregional programme promoting vocational training and the mobility of young people across Europe.

Promoting Youth Employment: The ‘Promoting Youth Employment’ (PYE) project aims to foster best practice and facilitate youth employment through the exchange of best practice at regional level.

External links
 "Assembly of European Regions"
 "AER Youth activities"
 "AER Youth Regional Network"

Events

2013
 YRN Fall Plenary meeting, 14-17 November 2013, Sfantu Gheorghe (RO): This meeting focused on the "Role of Education in Inclusive Society"
 YRN Spring Plenary meeting, 6 May 2013, Brussels (B)
 AER Conference on the Crisis and the Regions: "Youth as a source and a lever of regional growth in times of crisis", 8 March 2013, Warsaw (PL)

2012
 YRN Fall Plenary Meeting, 8–9 October 2012, Strasbourg (F): "Youth Democracy: Engagement & Influence in European Policy"
 YRN Spring Plenary Meeting, 7–9 May 2012, Vienna (A): "Equal Rights for all"

2011
 AER Youth Regional Network Fall Plenary & Seminar on Eastern Partnership, 27–28 October 2013, Wroclaw (PL)
 AER Youth Regional Network Spring Plenary Meeting & Conference on Youth Mobility, 21 April 2011, Orléans (F)
 YRN Presidium Meeting, 21–22 February 2011, Strasbourg (F)

2010
 YRN Spring Plenary meeting, 7–9 June 2010, Donja Stubica (HR): "Empowering youth through subisdiarity"

2009
 YRN's Take on Youth Employment & Autumn Plenary, 10–12 December 2009 in Paris  (F)
 "On the eve of the European elections" and Spring Plenary, 20–22 May 2009 in Krzyzowa (Dolny Slask, PL)

2008
 First Meeting of the AER Youth Regional Network on 23–25 November 2008 in Wiesbaden (Hessen, D): "The future belongs to us - but how should we handle it?"

References 

International organizations based in Europe
Youth organizations based in Europe